Madeleine Wanamaker (born 14 February 1995) is an American rower. In the 2018 World Rowing Championships, she won a gold medal in the women's coxless four event.

She has qualified to represent the United States at the 2020 Summer Olympics.

References

See also

American female rowers
World Rowing Championships medalists for the United States
Living people
1995 births
Rowers at the 2020 Summer Olympics
Sportspeople from Neenah, Wisconsin
21st-century American women